Shelbourne Park is a greyhound racing stadium in the south Dublin inner city suburb of Ringsend.

Greyhound Racing

Opening
The plans to open a greyhound track in Dublin were drawn up by Paddy O’Donoghue, Jerry Collins, Patsy McAlinden and Jim Clarke. Shelbourne Park opened on 14 May 1927 hot on the heels of Celtic Park (Belfast). The stadium located in the docklands in Ringsend was Dublin's answer to the Belfast track and the pair became the two most greyhound prestigious tracks in Irish racing. When opening in 1927 the track employed four resident trainers in Mick Horan, Paddy Quigley, Billy Donoghue and Ben Scally.

History
One year later it was decided to introduce the Easter Cup which commemorated the 1916 Easter Monday Rising in Dublin. However, the race soon became known for its own fame rather than its naming origins. The first winner was a greyhound called Odd Blade and the brindle dog went on to successfully defend his title the following year. Famously Mick the Miller equalled the world record time for 500 yards when recording 28.80 in 1928 but he only managed a runner-up spot to Odd Blade in that previously mentioned 1929 Easter Cup final. Mick went on to win the English Greyhound Derby that year for Shelbourne trainer Horan.

Shelbourne Park hosted the first official Irish Greyhound Derby which had been run on four previous occasions from 1928 to 1931 at rival track Harold's Cross Stadium. The first winner of the Irish Derby at Shelbourne was Guideless Joe owned by champion Irish jockey Jack Moyland and trained by local trainer Mick Horan.

The Oaks came to Shelbourne Park in 1935 and like the Irish Derby, was normally run every other year with Harolds Cross hosting in between. The Grand National took place here in 1933 & 1934 and the St Leger four times in the thirties but it was decided by the Irish Coursing Club that it was better to distribute the classics between several tracks. Another event was inaugurated in 1939 and that was the McAlinden Cup.

The remarkable greyhound called Tanist reached the final of the Easter Cup in April 1940, by smashing the track record at Shelbourne Park in 29.66sec and the legendary Spanish Battleship claimed his second of three Derby victories in 1954, also breaking the track record in the process. On 25 June 1946 Shelbourne used the first photo finish in Ireland during the semi-finals of the McAlinden Cup.

An extraordinary 1956 Irish Derby saw 'Keep Moving' break the track record twice before the sub-29-second barrier was broken by Prince of Bermuda.

Greyhound Racing Ireland formally known as Bord na gCon / Irish Greyhound Board installed a new totalisator system in 1960 and eight years later they then purchased the stadium itself  to stop the threat of redevelopment that was hanging over the stadium. A £240,000 investment followed and the same year that the Irish Derby found a permanent home at Shelbourne to the dismay of Harolds Cross supporters. The Shelbourne 600 sponsored by Guinness started in 1964 and the Oaks also became permanent at Shelbourne in 1980.

Paddy Ryan who became the Racing Manager in 1974 after taking over the reins from Jack O’Shea would hold the position for over 30 years before becoming general manager and then retiring in 2009. The Derby distance changed to 550 yards in 1986 and after a successful one-off feature in 1979 the Champion Stakes became an annual event in 1986.

With the closure of Celtic Park in 1983 Shelbourne became the premier track in Ireland and continues to provide most of the major events in the Irish racing calendar. In March 2021, the Board of Rásaíocht Con Éireann (Greyhound Racing Ireland) announced a two-stage €2.3 million plan for improvements at the venue.

Competitions
Irish Greyhound Derby
Champion Stakes
Easter Cup
Grand National
Juvenile Derby
McAlinden Cup
Oaks
Shelbourne Gold Cup
Shelbourne 600
St Leger

Current track records

Former track records

Football
The stadium also played host to the home matches of Shelbourne FC, who play in the League of Ireland, from 1913/14 to 1948/49. The first match was a 1–1 draw against Bohemians and their last match there was a 2–2 draw against Waterford. Shels left Shelbourne Park with the intention of building a new stadium in the nearby district of Irishtown.

While Shelbourne Park was the home of Shelbourne FC, they won one Irish Cup while competing in the Irish League and upon becoming founder members of the League of Ireland in 1921, won five league titles and one FAI Cup before moving on.

Shelbourne Park was the venue for two FAI Cup Final replays, in 1927 and 1929.

Trivia
Shelbourne Park appeared in the British motoring programme, Top Gear where Richard Hammond using a Mazda MX5 raced against a greyhound around the track. Despite Hammond's best efforts, the greyhound won.

Speedway Racing
Shelbourne Park staged Motorcycle speedway racing from 1950 to 1954, again in 1961 and again in 1970 and 1971. In 1951 it was a base for a team of American speedway riders including Nick Nicolaides, Don Hawley, Johnny Roccio, Manuel Trujillo, and Lloyd Campbell. The team raced at most of the UK tracks and often featured Ernie Roccio who was based at Wimbledon.

Car park 
Shelbourne Park provides pay and display car parking on days without major events. Hourly, daily, weekly and monthly rates are available. The car park is open on weekdays 6am to 10pm and not accessible during the night and on weekends.

References

Shelbourne F.C.
Greyhound racing venues in the Republic of Ireland
Ringsend
Defunct association football venues in the Republic of Ireland
Sports venues in Dublin (city)
Association football venues in County Dublin
1927 establishments in Ireland
Speedway venues in Ireland
Greyhound racing in Dublin (city)
Motorsport venues in the Republic of Ireland